UFC 157: Rousey vs. Carmouche was a mixed martial arts event held by the Ultimate Fighting Championship on February 23, 2013, at the Honda Center in Anaheim, California.

Background
The headline bout between Ronda Rousey and Liz Carmouche was the first-ever women's fight in UFC history. The two fought in the newly created 135-pound bantamweight division for the UFC Women's Bantamweight Championship. Rousey was the defending champion, as she was awarded the championship at a UFC on Fox: Henderson vs. Diaz pre-event press conference on December 6, 2012, prior to which she was the Strikeforce Women's Bantamweight Champion.

Manny Gamburyan was expected to face Chad Mendes at the event; however, Gamburyan was forced out of the bout with a thumb and elbow injury.  Mendes was then pulled from the card as a suitable replacement could not be found on short notice. As a result, the bout between Court McGee and Josh Neer was promoted to the main card.

At the weigh-ins, Nah-Shon Burrell came into his bout with Yuri Villefort heavy, weighing in at 175.8 lb.  Villefort had already agreed in advance to a catchweight bout and received a portion of Burrell's purse.

15,525 people purchased tickets to watch the event at the arena, and there were 450,000 pay-per-view buys.

Results

Bonus awards
Fighters were awarded $50,000 bonuses.

 Fight of the Night:  Dennis Bermudez vs. Matt Grice
 Knockout of the Night: Robbie Lawler
 Submission of the Night: Kenny Robertson

Reported payout
The following is the reported payout to the fighters as reported to the California State Athletic Commission. It does not include sponsor money and also does not include the UFC's traditional "fight night" bonuses or Pay-Per-View quotas.
 Ronda Rousey: $90,000 (includes $45,000 win bonus) def. Liz Carmouche: $12,000
 Lyoto Machida: $200,000 (no win bonus) def. Dan Henderson: $250,000
 Urijah Faber: $100,000 (includes $50,000 win bonus) def. Ivan Menjivar: $17,000
 Court McGee: $40,000 (includes $20,000 win bonus) def. Josh Neer: $16,000
 Robbie Lawler: $105,000 (includes $10,000 win bonus) def. Josh Koscheck: $78,000
 Brendan Schaub: $36,000 (includes $18,000 win bonus) def. Lavar Johnson: $29,000
 Michael Chiesa: $30,000 (includes $15,000 win bonus) def. Anton Kuivanen: $8,000
 Dennis Bermudez: $20,000 (includes $10,000 win bonus) def. Matt Grice: $8,000
 Sam Stout: $52,000 (includes $26,000 win bonus) def. Caros Fodor: $15,000
 Kenny Robertson: $16,000 (includes $8,000 win bonus) def. Brock Jardine: $8,000
 Neil Magny: $16,000 (includes $8,000 win bonus) def. Jon Manley: $8,000
 Nah-Shon Burrell: $12,500 (includes $7,000 win bonus) def. Yuri Villefort: $6,550 ^

^ Nah-Shon Burrell was fined and a percentage of his fight purse went to Yuri Villefort for failing to make the required weight for his fight.

See also
List of UFC events
2013 in UFC

References

2013 in sports in California
Ultimate Fighting Championship events
Events in Anaheim, California
2013 in mixed martial arts
Mixed martial arts in Anaheim, California
Sports competitions in Anaheim, California